The Ugandan Independence Tournament was an association football event taking place in 1962 to celebrate Ugandan Independence held at the Nakivubo Stadium in Kampala.  Three visiting teams played each other for the
right to face Uganda in the final. Kenya was invited to replace Egypt which was unable to participate due to its domestic schedule; as a result, the eventual teams were Ghana, Kenya and an 'all-star' representative team from the English Isthmian League. The competition took the format of a formal group stage and final and also featured exhibition matches between both teams within the formal competition and other international teams, taking place from 29 September to 18 October 1962.

Tournament  
The three challenging teams took part in a group stage from 29 September to 7 October in a round-robin format, in which they each played 2 games. The winner of this competition then proceeded through to the final against Uganda on 10 October.

Group stage 
In the group stage, two points were awarded for a win, with one point awarded for a draw. Ghana won their first game against Kenya 6–3, before drawing with Isthmian League to secure first place and move on to the final of the competition.

Final 
Ghana won the group stage and moved onto the final on 10 October 1962, where they subsequently beat Uganda, winning 4–1 at the Nakivubo Stadium.

Winners Tour 
The winners of the competition, Ghana, were to go on a short tour following the competition featuring friendlies in away games against Kenya, and the then national football teams of the prior states of Tanganyika and Nyasaland. They won all three games, playing each at the respective teams national stadiums.

Friendlies 
A friendly was played between Uganda and Isthmian League on 8 October, which ended in a 1–1 draw. This was the Isthmian's third game in 4 days and two of their players were replaced by members of the Kenyan team due to injury.

Top Scorers

References 

Football in Uganda